Esra Dermancıoğlu (born 7 December 1968) is a Turkish actress and comedian, known for her role as Mukaddes Ketenci in the drama series Fatmagül'ün Suçu Ne?. She also appears in Kırgın Çiçekler as Zehra.

Life and career 
Dermancıoğlu studied at Pierre Loti High School and continued her education at Franklin College Switzerland. She received acting lessons from Şahika Tekand at Stüdyo Oyuncuları and singing lessons from Derya Alabora. She made her acting debut with the help of Gülse Birsel by appearing in an episode of Avrupa Yakası. In 2010, she had a role in the short movie Moral Bozukluğu ve 31. Dermancıoğlu then continued her career on television. Her breakthrough came with her role in the Fatmagül'ün Suçu Ne? TV series, in which she played the role of Mukaddes. She further came to the spotlight by appearing in a leading role in the comedy movie Kadın İşi: Banka Soygunu.

Dermancıoğlu divorced her husband as he was against her decision to pursue a career in acting. The couple had a daughter.

Filmography

Television 
 Sen Harikasın, 2008
 Avruya Yakası, 2009, guest appearance
 Fatmagül'ün Suçu Ne?, 2010–2011, Mukaddes
 Küçük Hesaplar, 2012
 Galip Derviş, 2013, Şükriye "Şuşu"
 Doksanlar, 2013, Şükran Tuncay
 Sil Baştan, 2014
 Serçe Sarayı, 2015, Süla
 Muhteşem Yüzyıl: Kösem, 2015, Cennet Hatun
 Kırgın Çiçekler, 2016, Zehra Terinci
 Şahin Tepesi, 2018
 Bir Zamanlar Çukurova, 2019–2021, Behice Hekimoğlu
 Kaderimin Oyunu, 2021–2022, Zahide Demirhan
 Bir Küçük Gün Işığı, 2022–, Ümran

Film 
 Moral Bozukluğu ve 31, 2010, sexy neighbor
 Kadın İşi: Banka Soygunu, 2014, Dürdane
 Hayalet Dayı, 2015, Samet
 Merdiven Baba, 2015, Süheyla
 Ayla, 2017, Sebahat Dilbirliği

Awards 
21st Sadri Alışık Theatre and Cinema Awards - Best Supporting Actress in a Comedy Role (Hayalet Dayı)

References

External links 
 
 

1968 births
Living people
Turkish television actresses
Turkish film actresses